Piaroa (also called Guagua ~ Kuakua ~ Quaqua, Adole ~ Ature, Wo’tiheh) is an indigenous language of Colombia and Venezuela, native to the Huottüja people. Loukotka (1968) reports that it is spoken along the Sipapo River, Orinoco River, and Ventuari River.

A Wirö language (commonly called Maco) is closely related, the two forming the Piaroan branch of the family.

Phonology

References

Piaroa–Saliban languages
Languages of Colombia
Languages of Venezuela